Francis Beresford Young (10 October 1871 – 2 November 1946) was a New Zealand rugby union player. A forward, Young represented Wellington at a provincial level. He played just one match for the New Zealand national side, against the touring Queensland team in 1896.

During World War I, Young served in the New Zealand Expeditionary Force from 1917 to 1919, and saw active service in France. He was wounded in action in April 1918 and subsequently classified as physically unfit for war service.

References

1871 births
1946 deaths
Australian emigrants to New Zealand
New Zealand rugby union players
New Zealand international rugby union players
Wellington rugby union players
Rugby union forwards
New Zealand military personnel of World War I
Rugby union players from Hobart